Tokmak is a city in Uzbekistan located on the south of the Aral Sea. The area has a population of around 3,000. The town used to be on the coast, but because of the shrinking Aral Sea, it is now over 70 kilometers (43 miles) from the coast of the sea.

Populated places in Uzbekistan